Ibrahima N'Diaye (born 26 February 1964) is a Senegalese footballer. He played in seven matches for the Senegal national football team from 1992 to 1995. He was also named in Senegal's squad for the 1992 African Cup of Nations tournament.

References

1964 births
Living people
Senegalese footballers
Senegal international footballers
1992 African Cup of Nations players
Place of birth missing (living people)
Association footballers not categorized by position